This is a timeline documenting the events of heavy metal in 1983.

Newly formed bands
 Alcatrazz
Alisa
Artch
Assassin
 Autograph
Bad News 
Bad Steve
 Bathory
 Bon Jovi
Bride
 Carnivore
 Child'ƨ Play
Coroner
The Cult
Darxon
 Death
The Dogs D'Amour
Elixir 
 Excel (known as Chaotic Noise until 1985)
 Fastway
Fifth Angel
Forced Entry 
Gastunk 
 Hagar Schon Aaronson Shrieve
Halloween 
Heir Apparent
Hurricane
Impaler 
Jetboy
Kabát
King Kobra
Korzus
Lillian Axe
Lion 
Lizzy Borden
L.A. Guns
Malhavoc
 Master
 Megadeth
Melvins
Michael W. Smith
Mind Over Four
 Morbid Angel
MX 
Nasty Savage
Necronomicon 
 Necrophagia
Nothing Sacred 
Omen 
Parabellum  
 Poison
 Possessed
Q5 
Razor 
Red Hot Chili Peppers
Renegade
 Rigor Mortis
Rogue Male
S.O.B. 
Sacrifice
Samhain 
Santa  
Shy
Stratus
 Stryper
Taramis
 Testament (known as Legacy until 1986)
Tigertailz
Titan Force
Trixter
 Vader
Vengeance 
Warrant 
 White Lion

Albums & EPs

 AC/DC – Flick of the Switch
 Accept – Balls to the Wall
 Ace Lane – See You In Heaven
 Acid – Maniac
 Alcatrazz – No Parole from Rock N' Roll
 Alice Cooper – DaDa
 Alien (US) – Cosmic Fantasy (EP)
 The Angels, aka Angel City – Watch the Red
 Anvil – Forged in Fire
 Argus - Argus (EP)
 Armored Saint – Armored Saint (EP)
 Ashbury – Endless Skies
 Atomic Rooster – 'Headline News
 Axe Witch - The Lord of Flies 
 Barón Rojo – Metalmorfosis
 Battleaxe – Burn This Town
 Billy Idol - Rebel Yell
 Bitch – Be My Slave
 Bitches Sin –  No More Chances (EP)
 Black Angels – Kickdown
 Blackfoot – Siogo
 Black Sabbath – Born Again
 Blowin Free - Enemy
 Blue Öyster Cult – The Revölution by Night
 Bodine – Three Times Running
 Bow Wow – Holy Expedition - Live
 Bullet (Ger) – No Mercy
 Cacumen – Bad Widow
 Chateaux – Chained and Desperate
 Cobra – First Strike
 Coney Hatch – Outta Hand
 Culprit – Guilty as Charged!
 Cutty Sark – Hardrock Power (EP)
 Dark Lord – Dark Lord (EP) 
 Dedringer – Second Arising
 Def Leppard – Pyromania
 Demon – The Plague
 Diamond Head – Canterbury
 Dio – Holy Diver
 Dokken – Breaking the Chains (US release)
 Earthshaker – Earthshaker
 Easy Action – Easy Action
 Europe – Europe
 Exciter – Heavy Metal Maniac
 Fastway – Fastway
 Fighter –  No Pain No Gain
 Fist (Can) – In the Red
 Lita Ford – Out for Blood
 Girlschool – Play Dirty
 Gotham City - Black Writs (EP)
 Grand Prix - Samurai
 Great White – Out of the Night (EP)
 Grim Reaper – See You in Hell
 HSAS – Through the Fire
 Hanoi Rocks – Back to Mystery City
 Hawaii – One Nation Underground
 H-Bomb – Coup de Metal (EP)
 Headpins – Line of Fire
 Heavy Load – Stronger Than Evil
 Heavy Pettin – Lettin' Loose
 Hellanbach – Now Hear This
 High Power – High Power
 Highway Chile – Storybook Heroes
 Highway Chile – Fever (EP)
 Helix – No Rest for the Wicked
 Hellion – Hellion (EP)
 Holocaust – Live (Hot Curry & Wine) 
 Iron Maiden – Piece of Mind
 Jade – Teasing Eyes
 Jag Panzer – Tyrants (EP)
 Joshua – The Hand Is Quicker Than the Eye (EP)
 Key West - First Invasion
 Killer  (Swi) – Stronger Than Ever
 Killer Dwarfs – Killer Dwarfs
 KISS – Lick It Up
 KIX – Cool Kids
 Krokus – Headhunter
 Lady Killer – Lady Killer 
 Leather Angel – We Came to Kill (EP)
 Le Griffe – Fast Bikes (EP)
 Le Mans – On the Streets
 Greg Leon Invasion - Greg Leon Invasion
 Loudness – The Law of Devil's Land
 Loudness – Live-Loud-Alive: Loudness in Tokyo 
 Magnum – The Eleventh Hour
 Mama's Boys – Turn It Up
 Manilla Road – Crystal Logic
 Manowar – Into Glory Ride
 Mass (Ger) - Metal Fighter 
 Max Havoc – Max Havoc
 Max Lynx – Take One
 McCoy – McCoy (EP)
 Mercyful Fate – Melissa
 Metallica – Kill 'Em All
 Metal Massacre - Metal Massacre III (Compilation, various artists)
 Metal Massacre - Metal Massacre IV (Compilation, various artists)
 Mindless Sinner – Master of Evil (EP)
 Molly Hatchet – No Guts...No Glory
 Gary Moore – Dirty Fingers
 Gary Moore – Victims of the Future
 Gary Moore – Rockin' Every Night – Live in Japan 
 Gary Moore – Live at the Marquee 
 Mötley Crüe – Shout at the Devil
 Motörhead – Another Perfect Day
 MSG – Built to Destroy
 Night Ranger – Midnight Madness
 Nightwing – Stand Up and Be Counted 
 No Bros – Our Own Way
 Aldo Nova – Subject
 Onslaught - What Lies Ahead (Demo)
 Ostrogoth – Full Moon's Eyes (EP)
 Overdrive – Metal Attack
 Oz – Fire in the Brain
 Ozzy Osbourne – Bark at the Moon
 Pandemonium – Heavy Metal Soldiers
 Pantera – Metal Magic
 Picture – Eternal Dark
 Pretty Maids – Pretty Maids (EP)
 Quartz – Against All Odds
 Queensrÿche – Queensrÿche (EP)
 Quiet Riot – Metal Health
 Rage (UK) – Run for the Night
 Rated X - Rock Blooded
 Raven – All for One
 Ratt – Ratt (EP)
 Riff Raff – Give the Dead Man Some Water
 Riot – Born in America
 Ritual – Widow
 Roadrunner - Teenage Warcry (EP)
 Rock Goddess – Rock Goddess
 Rock Goddess – Hell Hath No Fury
 The Rods – In the Raw
 The Rods – Live (live)
 Satan – Court in the Act
 Satan Jokers – Les Fils du Métal
 Savage – Loose 'N Lethal
 Savage Grace – The Dominatress (EP)
 Savatage – Sirens
 Saxon – Power & the Glory
 Shy – Once Bitten... Twice...
 Silver Mountain – Shakin' Brains
 Sinner – Fast Decision
 Six Feet Under (Swe) – Six Feet Under
 Slayer (S.A. Slayer) – Prepare to Die (EP)
 Slayer – Show No Mercy
 Sledgehammer – Blood on Their Hands
 Sortilège – Sortilège (EP)
 Sound Barrier – Total Control
 Spartan Warrior – Steel n' Chains
 Stampede – Hurricane Town
 Starfighters – In-Flight Movie
 Steeler – Steeler
 Suicidal Tendencies – Suicidal Tendencies
 Takashi – Kamikaze Killers (EP)
 Talas – Live Speed on Ice 
 Tank – This Means War
 Terraplane  –  I Survive (EP)
 Thin Lizzy – Thunder and Lightning
 Thin Lizzy – Life - Live
 Thor – Unchained (EP)
 Thunderstick – Feel Like Rock'n'Roll? (EP)
 Tokyo Blade – Tokyo Blade
 Torch – Torch
 Bernie Tormé – Electric Gypsies
 Trance – Power Infusion
 Triumph – Never Surrender
 Twisted Sister – You Can't Stop Rock 'n' Roll
 220 Volt – 220 Volt
 UFO – Making Contact
 Vanadium – A Race with the Devil
 Vandenberg – Heading for a Storm
 Vardis – The Lion's Share (comp)
 Vault – No More Escape
 Victim – Power Hungry 
 Virgin Steele – Guardians of the Flame
 Virgin Steele – Wait for the Night (EP)
 Vixen – Made in Hawaii (EP)
 Warlord – Deliver Us (EP)
 Warriors – Warriors
 White Heat – Krakatoa
 Wild Dogs – Wild Dogs
 Wildfire – Brute Force and Ignorance
 Winterkat – Winterkat (EP)
 Witchfinder General – Friends of Hell
 Witchfynde – Cloak and Dagger
 Xcursion – Xcursion (EP)
 Y&T – Mean Streak
 Zebra – Zebra
 Zero Nine – Headline

Events
 Yngwie Malmsteen starts performing in the band Steeler. Also in that band was vocalist Ron Keel (later on Keel) and former W.A.S.P. bassist Rik Fox. The band produced only one album, Steeler.
 April 11: Metallica fires lead guitarist Dave Mustaine for substance abuse issues, replacing him with Exodus guitarist Kirk Hammett; Mustaine subsequently forms the band Megadeth.
 KISS ends the use of makeup in their act.
 November 19: the single by Quiet Riot "Cum on Feel the Noize" is No. 5 on the Billboard Hot 100.
 April 17: Mountain bassist, and Cream producer, Felix Pappalardi is shot and killed by his wife Gail Collins Pappalardi.
 Metallica and Slayer both release their debut albums Kill 'Em All and Show No Mercy.
 After his song "Runaway" becomes a surprise hit on New York radio station WAPP-FM, Jon Bon Jovi forms the band Bon Jovi.

References

1980s in heavy metal music
Metal